Brisbane–Woodford Road is the official name for a continuous  road route in the Moreton Bay local government area of Queensland, Australia. It is designated as part of State Route 58. It is a state-controlled road (number 401) part regional and part district, rated as a local road of regional significance (LRRS).

Route description
Brisbane–Woodford Road is a continuous road route comprising three distinct components, each of which retains its former name:

Gympie Road
It is signed as State Route 58, which also continues east on Gympie Road and Strathpine Sub-Arterial Road to an intersection with the Bruce Highway. It is a four-lane divided road for its entire length. Land use along this road is mainly commercial.

In Strathpine, South Pine Road (State Route 28) exits to the south, and Samsonvale Road to the west. The road passes the Strathpine shopping centre and many commercial premises, crossing Four Mile Creek into Lawnton and the North Pine River into Petrie. As it enters Petrie it passes the Moreton Bay campus of the University of the Sunshine Coast and crosses the North Coast railway line.

At a three-way intersection in Petrie; Gympie Road ends, Brisbane-Woodford Road continues north-west as Dayboro Road (State Route 58), and Anzac Avenue runs north-east as State Route 71.

Dayboro Road

It is a two-lane sealed road for most of its length. Land use along the road is residential in Petrie and rural for the remainder. In Petrie, Youngs Crossing Road exits to the south-west. Just beyond the Petrie boundary the road passes between Lake Kurwongbah to the north and the North Pine Dam to the south. The road enters Dayboro as Hay Road, crossing Terrors Creek as it reaches the town.

At a T-junction in Dayboro; Hay Road ends, Brisbane-Woodford Road turns north as Mount Mee Road (State Route 58), and Williams Street runs west as State Route 22.

Mount Mee Road

It is a two-lane sealed road for its entire length. Land use along the road is almost totally rural. In Mount Mee, Campbells Pocket Road exits to the east, and in Delaneys Creek, Delaney Creek Road exits to the west. The road ends at a T-junction with the D'Aguilar Highway (State Route 85) in D'Aguilar.

Upgrade projects
A project to develop a 20-year vision for the section of Dayboro Road between Gympie Road and Youngs Crossing Road in Petrie began in 2021. Community consultation occurred in the period October-November 2021.

A project to upgrade the intersection of Gympie Road, Anzac Avenue and Dayboro Road at Petrie, at a cost of $30 million, was completed in March 2022.

History
A bridge over the South Pine River from Bald Hills to Strathpine was completed by 1866. Cobb & Co coaches travelled through the area from 1867.

In 1859 Tom Petrie acquired the lease of land in what is now the Petrie district. By 1870 a hostelry had been established on the land, as the location of the first change of horses for Cobb & Co coaches travelling north from Brisbane. The North Pine River was crossed at a ford nearby. In 1877 a low-level bridge was opened.

The Dayboro district was settled by Europeans from 1866. The railway did not arrive in Dayboro until 1920. A Motor transport service from Dayboro to Brisbane operated from the late 1920s, and a bus service from 1936. In 1937 this was extended to Mount Mee.

Timber-getters operated in the Mount Mee district from 1873. Before a sawmill was built locally the cut timber was transported to D'Aguilar and beyond.

Major intersections
All distances are from Google Maps. The road is within the Moreton Bay local government area.

See also

 List of road routes in Queensland
 List of numbered roads in Queensland

Notes

References

Roads in Queensland